Akershus is a traditional region and current electoral district in Norway, with Oslo as its main city and traditional capital. It is named after the Akershus Fortress in Oslo. From the middle ages to 1919, Akershus was a fief and main county that included most of Eastern Norway, and from the 17th century until 2020, Akershus also had a more narrow meaning as a (sub) county that included most of the Greater Oslo Region. After 2020 the former county of Akershus was merged into Viken along with the former counties of Østfold and Buskerud. In 2022 the Storting voted to dissolve Viken and reestablish Akershus county.

Originally Akershus was one of four main fiefs in Norway and included almost all of Eastern Norway. The original Akershus became a main county (Stiftamt or Stift) in 1662 and was sometimes also known as Christiania Stift. It included several subcounties (Amt or Underamt); in 1682 its most central areas, consisting of modern Oslo and Akershus, became the subcounty of Akershus within the larger main county of the same name. In 1842 the capital city of Christiania, which at the time consisted of a tiny part of modern Oslo, became a separate subcounty within Akershus main county. The main county of Akershus was disestablished in 1919, and the subcounty continued as Akershus county (fylke). During its history Akershus (sub) county ceded territory to Oslo several times; Akershus' most central and important municipality, Aker, was transferred to Oslo in 1948.

The remaining county of Akershus after 1948 borders Hedmark, Oppland, Buskerud, Oslo, and Østfold; it also has a short border with Sweden (Värmland). Akershus, with a little over 614,000 inhabitants, is the second most populated county by population after Oslo. The county administration is in central Oslo, which is not part of the modern county per se.

Geography 
As a geographical term the meaning of Akershus has changed over time. Akershus originally primarily referred to Akershus main county, which included most of Eastern Norway, with the exception of Upper Telemark and Båhuslen (now mainly part of Sweden). The modern Akershus county is a direct continuation of the subcounty of Akershus, created in 1682, and included all of modern Oslo and Akershus. 1842 the capital city of Christiania, which at the time consisted of a tiny part of modern Oslo, became a separate subcounty within Akershus main county. Akershus main county ceased to exist in 1919, after which Akershus in everyday usage became synonymous with the modern county that excluded Christiania. Akershus' most central and important municipality, Aker, was transferred to and merged with Oslo in 1948.

After 1948, the remaining Akershus county is conventionally divided into Asker and Bærum to the west of Oslo, Follo and Romerike.

Embracing numerous suburbs and urban areas of Oslo, notably Bærum and historically Aker, Akershus is one of the most densely populated areas in the country. The main national railway lines into Oslo run through Akershus with many junctions and stations such as Asker, Sandvika, Ski, and Lillestrøm. Akershus includes some of the lake Mjøsa and some of the river Glomma.

The county also includes the historical place Eidsvoll, 48 km north of Oslo, in which the national assembly ratified the Norwegian constitution in 1814.  South of Eidsvoll is the international airport, Oslo Airport at Gardermoen. Oslo's previous international airport, Fornebu, is also located in Akershus. The estate of the crown prince is located in Asker (the royal palace is in Oslo).

Mountains in Akershus

Infrastructure
The county has two major hospitals, Akershus University Hospital and Sykehuset Asker og Bærum.

The main road from continental Europe, E6, enters Akershus in the south, and runs through eastern Oslo, further to Gardermoen, and into Hedmark County on the eastern shores of lake Mjøsa.

E18 enters Akershus in the south-east, merges for a short stretch with E6 at Vinterbro in Ås, before running under central Oslo. E18 then turns south-west through Bærum and Asker before entering Buskerud County north of Drammen.

E16 runs from the intersection with E18 in Sandvika into Buskerud County west of Sollihøgda.

All main railways out of Oslo run through Akershus:

 Southwest: the Drammen Line
 Southeast: the Østfold Line as two separate railways
 North: the Gjøvik Line
 Northeast: the Trunk Line, Gardermoen Line, and Dovre Line
 East: the Kongsvinger Line

History
Akershus became a fief in the 16th century, and then also included the current counties of Hedmark, Oppland, Buskerud, and Oslo, as well as the municipalities of Askim, Eidsberg, and Trøgstad in the county of Østfold. In 1662, Akershus became an Amt, and in 1685, Buskerud was separated from Akershus and became an Amt of its own. In 1768, Hedmark and Oppland were also separated from Akershus to become Oplandenes Amt (and Askim, Eidsberg, and Trøgstad were transferred to Østfold). In 1842, the city of Christiania (Oslo) was made a separate Amt, as well. In 1919, the term Amt was changed to Fylke. In 1948, Aker, the greatest and the most populous municipality of Akershus, was transferred to the county of Oslo.

Name
The county is named after Akershus Fortress. The fortress was built in 1299, and the meaning of the name is "the (fortified) house of (the district) Aker". The name is somewhat misleading now, since the fortress is now outside Akershus (it is in Oslo County since 1842). In fact, the administration of Akershus sits outside the county, as well, in the centre of Oslo.

Coat-of-arms
The coat-of-arms is from modern times (1987). It shows a gable from Akershus Fortress.

Municipalities 

Akershus has a total of 22 municipalities:

Asker
Aurskog-Høland
Bærum
Eidsvoll
Enebakk
Fet
Frogn
Gjerdrum
Hurdal
Lørenskog
Nannestad

Nes
Nesodden
Nittedal
Oppegård
Rælingen
Skedsmo
Ski
Sørum
Ullensaker
Vestby
Ås

Districts

 Asker og Bærum (Norwegian)
 Follo
 Fornebu
 Gjelleråsen
 Greater Oslo Region
 Haslum
 Heggedal
 Hosle
 Jar, Norway
 Kolbotn
 Nedre Romerike
 Øvre Romerike
 Romerike
 Skui
 Slependen
 Snarøya

Cities

 Drøbak
 Jessheim
 Lillestrøm
 Sandvika
 Ski

Parishes

 Asker
 Aurskog
 Bjørke
 Blaker
 Bærum
 Drøbak
 Eidsvoll
 Enebakk
 Feiring
 Fenstad
 Fet
 Frogn
 Frogner
 Garder
 Gjerdrum
 Hakadal
 Hemnes
 Heni
 Holter
 Hovin
 Hurdal
 Hvitsten
 Høland
 Høvik
 Kroer
 Kråkstad
 Langset
 Lillestrøm
 Løken, see Høland
 Lørenskog
 Maria kirke
 Nannestad
 Nes
 Nesodden
 Nittedal
 Nordby
 Oppegård
 Rælingen
 Setskog (Sitskogen)
 Skedsmo
 Ski
 Stensgård
 Søndre Høland
 Sørum
 Såner
 Udenes
 Ullensaker
 Vestby
 Vestre Bærum
 Østre Bærum
 Ås

Villages

 Algarheim
 Alværn
 Ask
 Askkroken
 Aulifeltet
 Aursmoen
 Bekkeberga
 Bekkestua
 Berger
 Billingstad
 Bjerkås
 Bjørkelangen
 Bjørnemyr
 Blaker
 Blakstad
 Blommenholm
 Blylaget
 Blystadlia
 Bodung
 Bomannsvik
 Borgen, Asker
 Borgen, Ullensaker
 Brevik
 Bråtesletta
 Brudalen
 Brårud
 Burås
 Bærums Verk
 Bærumsmarka
 Bøn
 Dal
 Dalsroa
 Danskerud
 Dikemark
 Drengsrud
 Drøbak
 Dønski
 Eidsvoll Verk
 Eiksmarka
 Eltonåsen
 Enebakkneset
 Fagerstrand
 Feiring
 Fenstad
 Finnbråten
 Finstadbru
 Finstadjordet
 Fjellfoten
 Fjellhamar
 Fjellsrud
 Fjellstad
 Fjellstrand
 Fjerdingby
 Flaskebekk
 Flateby
 Fosser
 Frogner
 Gan
 Garder
 Gardermoen
 Grav
 Greverud
 Grinitajet
 Grønlundfjellet
 Grønvoll
 Gullhella
 Gullverket
 Haga
 Hakadal
 Hammerstad
 Hauerseter
 Hanaborg
 Heer
 Hellerud
 Hellvik, Akershus
 Hemnes
 Hogsetfeltet
 Hurdal
 Hurdal Verk
 Hvam
 Hvitsten
 Hølen
 Høvik
 Håkavik
 Ingeborgrud
 Jessheim
 Jong
 Kampå
 Kirkebygda
 Kirkerud
 Kjeller
 Kjenn
 Kjul
 Kjøvangen
 Kjøya
 Kløfta
 Kolbotn
 Konglungen
 Kringler
 Kråkstad
 Kurland
 Langhus
 Langset
 Leirsund
 Lierfoss
 Lindeberg
 Lommedalen
 Lundermoen
 Lysaker
 Løkeberg
 Løken
 Løkenfeltet
 Lørenfallet
 Løstad
 Løvenstad
 Maura
 Minnesund
 Mogreina
 Momoen
 Nerdrum
 Nesbru
 Neskollen
 Nesoddtangen
 Nesset
 Nesøya
 Nordbyhagen
 Nordkisa
 Oksval
 Onsrud
 Oppegård
 Oppåkermoen
 Pepperstad skog
 Rasta
 Rotnes
 Rud
 Rustadbruk
 Rustadmoen
 Rykkinn
 Rælingen
 Røykås
 Råholt
 Rånåsfoss
 Sand
 Sem
 Sessvollmoen
 Seterstøa
 Setskog
 Siggerud
 Sjøstrand
 Skaugum
 Skedsmokorset
 Skiphelle
 Skjetten
 Skotbu
 Skrukkelia
 Skulerud
 Skytta
 Skårer
 Slattum
 Slattumhagen
 Smestad
 Sofiemyr
 Solberg
 Solemskogen
 Son
 Store Brevik
 Strømmen
 Styrigrenda
 Sundbyhagen
 Svarterud
 Svartskog
 Svestad
 Sværsvann
 Sørumsand
 Såner
 Tanum
 Teigebyen
 Togrenda
 Torget, Hurdal
 Torget, Nesodden
 Trandum
 Trollåsen
 Tårnåsen
 Ursvik
 Vardeåsen
 Vestby
 Vettre
 Vevelstad
 Vinterbro
 Visperud
 Voll
 Vollen
 Vormsund
 Vøyenenga
 Ytre Enebakk
 Østerås
 Åkrene
 Åneby
 Årnes
 Ås
 Åsgreina
 Åsgrenda
 Sundet

Former Municipalities

 Aker
 Aurskog
 Blaker
 Drøbak
 Feiring
 Hvitsten
 Høland
 Hølen
 Kråkstad
 Lillestrøm
 Nordre Høland
 Setskog
 Son
 Søndre Høland

Notable residents 
People from Akershus
Kristoffer Ajer (1998-), football player (Celtic FC), national team.
Harriet Backer (1845-1932), artist, painter educated in Oslo, Berlin, Munich and Paris.
Jo Benkow (1924-2013), WWII pilot and politician, President of Stortinget 1985-1993.
John Carew (1979-), former football player (Lørenskog, Vålerenga, Valencia, Lyon, Aston Villa), with 24 goals for Norway. 
Bjørn Dæhlie (1967), cross-country skier and most-winning skier globally, with 8 gold medals from Winter Olympics.
Kai Eide, diplomat, writer and politician. Special UN envoy to Kosovo in 2005, Head of UN Mission to Afghanistan 2008-2010.
Åslaug Haga (1959-), politician, member of parliament and government, President of Global Crop Diversity Trust 2013-2020.
Morten Harket (1959-), musician and singer, vocal of pop group A-ha.
Trygve Haavelmo (1911-1999), economist and Nobel Prize laureate.
Anniken Huitfeldt, politician, Chair of Stortinget Committee on Foreign Relations and Defence.
Carl Otto Løvenskiold (1839-1916), politician, and briefly Prime Minister in Stockholm in 1884.
Rolf Presthus (1936-1988), politician, former Chairman of Conservative Party and Minister of Finance.
Jan Tore Sanner (1966-), politician, Minister of Finance in Norway since 2020.
Reiulf Steen (1933-2014), politician, Chairman of the Norwegian Labour Party 1965-1975
Johan Herman Wessel (1742-1785), poet and early satiric author.

References

External links
Akershus county website
 
 

 
Former counties of Norway
2020 disestablishments in Norway
States and territories disestablished in 2020